The men's middleweight (−84 kilograms) event at the 2002 Asian Games took place on 12 October 2002 at Gudeok Gymnasium, Busan, South Korea.

Like all Asian Games taekwondo events, the competition was a straight single-elimination tournament. 

A total of 11 men from 11 countries competed in this event, limited to fighters whose body weight was less than 84 kilograms. Kim Kyong-hun of South Korea won the gold medal.

Schedule
All times are Korea Standard Time (UTC+09:00)

Results 
Legend
DQ — Won by disqualification
W — Won by withdrawal

References
2002 Asian Games Official Report, Page 724

External links
Official website

Taekwondo at the 2002 Asian Games